This is an incomplete list of military confrontations that have occurred within the boundaries of the modern US State of Kentucky since European contact. The region was part of New France from 1679 to 1763, ruled by Great Britain from 1763 to 1783, and part of the United States from 1783 to present.

Several wars that have directly affected the region including the French and Indian War (1754–1763), American Revolutionary War (1775–1783), Northwest Indian War (1785–1795), Tecumseh's War (1811–1812), War of 1812 (1812–1814), and the American Civil War (1860–1865).

Battles

See also

History of Kentucky
Kentucky in the American Civil War

Notes

Kentucky in the American Civil War
Battles
History of Kentucky